Timothy Matthew Jitloff (born January 11, 1985) is a retired World Cup alpine ski racer from the United States. He specializes in giant slalom and competed in five World Championships and two Winter Olympics.

Born in Reno, Nevada, Jitloff was named to the U.S. Development Team with the 2005 season and moved from the 20s in 2004 NorAms into the teens and single-number results during Winter 2005 as he also saw his first racing in Europe. He has since been a member of the 2007 FIS Alpine World Ski Championships Team. He made the US team for the 2010 Winter Olympics in late 2009 and competed in the giant slalom for the United States in the 2014 Winter Olympics.

Jitloff retired from international competition in March 2018.

Career highlights
2005 – Sprint/Ski Racing Junior Skier of the Year. Also the combined gold medalist at the Junior World Championships.

2007 – NorAm giant slalom champion with two wins

Injuries
2006 – An injured left ACL ended his season early

World Cup results

Season standings

Top ten finishes
0 podiums; 2 top fives

World Championship results

Olympic results

References

External links
 
 Tim Jitloff World Cup standings at the International Ski Federation
 
 
 U.S. Ski Team – Tim Jitloff

1985 births
American male alpine skiers
Living people
Alpine skiers at the 2014 Winter Olympics
Alpine skiers at the 2018 Winter Olympics
Olympic alpine skiers of the United States